Guadalupe Reyes is a Mexican comedy film directed by Salvador Espinosa, from a screenplay by Erik Zuckermann, Harald Rumpler, and Marcos Bucay. The film stars Juan Pablo Medina and Martín Altomaro, alongside Begoña Narváez, María de la Fuente, Paco Rueda, Memo Villegas, Salvador Zerboni, Roberto Duarte, Tato Alexander, Juan Carlos Colombo, Ofelia Medina, Mauricio Isaac, Arap Bethke, and Emiliano Zurita. The film premiered on 29 November 2019 in Mexico.

Cast 
 Juan Pablo Medina 
 Martín Altomaro
 Begoña Narváez
 María de la Fuente
 Paco Rueda
 Memo Villegas 
 Salvador Zerboni
 Roberto Duarte
 Tato Alexander
 Juan Carlos Colombo
 Ofelia Medina
 Mauricio Isaac
 Arap Bethke
 Emiliano Zurita

References 

2019 films
2010s Mexican films